Peptidoglycan glycosyltransferase is an enzyme used in the biosynthesis of peptidoglycan. It transfers a disaccharide-peptide from a donor substrate to synthesize a glycan chain.

This enzyme belongs to the family of glycosyltransferases, specifically the hexosyltransferases.  The systematic name of this enzyme class is undecaprenyldiphospho-(N-acetyl-D-glucosaminyl-(1->4)-(N-acetyl-D-mu ramoylpentapeptide):undecaprenyldiphospho-(N-acetyl-D-glucosaminyl-( 1->4)-N-acetyl-D-muramoylpentapeptide) disaccharidetransferase. Other names in common use include PG-II, bactoprenyldiphospho-N-acetylmuramoyl-(N-acetyl-D-glucosaminyl)-, pentapeptide:peptidoglycan, N-acetylmuramoyl-N-acetyl-D-glucosaminyltransferase, penicillin binding protein (3 or 1B), and peptidoglycan transglycosylase.

Function 
Peptidoglycan glycosyltransferase couples Lipid II subunits to synthesize the peptidoglycan chains. Transpeptidases crosslink the carbohydrate chains to provide the framework for the cell wall.

It catalyzes the chemical reaction
 [GlcNAc-(1->4)-Mur2Ac(oyl-L-Ala-gamma-D-Glu-L-Lys-D-Ala-D-Ala)]n-diphosphoundecaprenol + GlcNAc-(1->4)-Mur2Ac(oyl-L-Ala-gamma-D-Glu-L-Lys-D-Ala-D-Ala)-diphosphoundecaprenol
 ⇌
 [GlcNAc-(1->4)-Mur2Ac(oyl-L-Ala-gamma-D-Glu-L-Lys-D-Ala-D-Ala)]n+1- diphosphoundecaprenol + undecaprenyl diphosphate

The 2 substrates of this enzyme are
 [GlcNAc-(1->4)-Mur2Ac(oyl-L-Ala-gamma-D-Glu-L-Lys-D-Ala-D-Ala)]n-diphosphoundecaprenol,
 GlcNAc-(1->4)-Mur2Ac(oyl-L-Ala-gamma-D-Glu-L-Lys-D-Ala-D-Ala)-diphosphoundecaprenol,

whereas its 2 products are
 [GlcNAc-(1->4)-Mur2Ac(oyl-L-Ala-gamma-D-Glu-L-Lys-D-Ala-D-Ala)]n+1-diphosphoundecaprenol, and
 undecaprenyl diphosphate.

Structural studies

References 

EC 2.4.1
Enzymes of known structure